Edwin E. Grant (August 2, 1887 - August 23, 1966) served in the California legislature as a state Senator of the 19th District, representing San Francisco. In 1914 he was the subject of the second successful recall attempt in California history, in which he was replaced by Ed Wolfe.

Grant's recall was sparked by his cosponsorship of the Red Light Abatement Act, legislation purportedly aimed at curbing prostitution, a stance at odds with constituents in a San Francisco red-light district he represented. Wolfe, who had previously run against Grant in 1912 and lost by just 95 votes, was elected with 53 percent voting for recall. Grant lost by a margin of three-to-one in San Francisco's vice and financial districts.

References

External links
Join California Edwin E. Grant

Place of birth missing
Place of death missing
20th-century American politicians
1887 births
1966 deaths
Democratic Party California state senators
Recalled state legislators of the United States